KWRD-FM (100.7 MHz) is a commercial radio station licensed to Highland Village, Texas, and serving the Dallas-Fort Worth Metroplex. It is owned by the Salem Media Group and broadcasts a Christian talk and teaching radio format.  The call sign represents the station's moniker, "The Word," as in The Word of God.  KWRD-FM is not co-owned with KWRD (AM) in Henderson, Texas.

KWRD-FM has an effective radiated power of 98,000 watts.  The transmitter is off Minnis Road in Collinsville, Texas.  The studios and offices are located in Irving.

Programming
KWRD-FM features both national and local religious leaders.  It is a brokered programming station, in which hosts pay for blocks of time on the station and may seek donations to their ministries during their shows.  Hosts include Jim Daly, Charles Stanley, John MacArthur and Alistair Begg.  Some conservative political shows are also heard, including Jay Sekulow and Eric Metaxas from the Salem Radio Network.  News comes from SRN, the Salem Radio News service.

History

KRJT-FM
The station first signed on the air on November 15, 1988 as KRJT-FM in Bowie, Texas.  It largely simulcasted its AM sister station, KRJT (1410 AM, now KNTX).  KRJT-FM’s effective radiated power was 3,000 watts, a fraction of its current output.

Bowie is about 90 miles northwest of the Dallas-Fort Worth Metroplex.  The owners realized that if their FM station could move closer to Dallas, its value would greatly increase.  The Federal Communications Commission granted its request to become a "move in" station.  It changed its city of license to Highland Village, just north of both Dallas and Fort Worth, and the transmitter was relocated to Collinsville with a big increase in power, 98,000 watts.

KLTY and KWRD-FM
In 1997, Salem Communications bought KEWS.  That station had a long history of broadcasting Christian programming, once owned by evangelist Jimmy Swaggart.  Salem began running its own Christian talk and teaching format on the station as KWRD-FM, The Word 94.9.  In early 2000, Salem acquired an FM station on 100.7 in the Dallas suburbs, airing Christian Contemporary music as KLTY-FM.

On December 22, 2000, Salem swapped the two stations' frequencies to give KLTY the stronger signal.

On September 18, 2015, KWRD-FM began simulcasting on former Radio Disney affiliate KMKI (620 AM, now KTNO) for a week. The following week, KMKI switched formats to Business News/Talk with content formerly airing on KVCE (1160 AM).  On October 20, 2015, KWRD-FM's programming was again simulcast on KVCE.  That station is now KBDT, with new owners and a talk radio format.

KPXI
KPXI (100.7 MHz   currently KTYK )  had been originally licensed to Mount Pleasant and the ownership had tried to be the move in to DFW winner but the former KJRT eventually prevailed in the contest. Salem Media bought KPXI out of foreclosure and moved it to Overton  (near Tyler) to clear the frequency for the 100.7 in DFW.  KPXI simulcast KWRD-FM until early 2009. when the FCC approved the transfer of KPXI to Jerry T. Hanszen owner of KGAS and KMHT.  In 2018, KPXI was sold to Louisiana State University Shreveport and now operates as public radio station KTYK Overton, broadcasting the Red River Radio network.

Signal
Unlike most of the area's FM stations like sister KLTY, which transmit their signals from Cedar Hill, KWRD-FM transmits its signal from an area east of Collinsville. Therefore, KWRD-FM's signal is much stronger in the northern parts of the Dallas/Fort Worth metroplex including Dallas, Denton, and McKinney as well as the cities of Decatur, Gainesville, Sherman, and Bonham, to as far north as Ardmore and Durant, Oklahoma, but is considerably weaker in Fort Worth and areas south of Dallas.

References

External links
The Word 100.7 FM official website

 DFW Radio/TV History

WRD-FM
WRD-FM
Radio stations established in 1987
Salem Media Group properties